"No Time at All" was an American television film broadcast on February 13, 1958, as part of the CBS television series, Playhouse 90.  It was the 23rd episode of the second season of Playhouse 90.

The film was based on Charles Einstein's 1957 novel and directed by David Swift. It featured a large cast that included William Lundigan, Betsy Palmer, Keenan Wynn, Sylvia Sidney, Buster Keaton, Chico Marx, Jack Haley, and Charles Bronson.

Plot
A stricken airliner disappears from radar on a flight from Miami to New York. The film follows the consequences for friends and relatives of the passengers.

Cast
The following performers received screen credit for their performances:

 William Lundigan as Ben Gammon
 Betsy Palmer as Emmy Verdon
 Jane Greer as Karen
 Keenan Wynn as Marshall Keats
 Cliff Edwards as Webber's Manager
 Harry Einstein as Mr. Laurie
 Jay C. Flippen as Happy Gallant
 Reginald Gardiner as Felix Allardyce
 James Gleason as Dolph Grimes
 Jack Haley as Stanley Leeds
 Florence Halop as Mrs. Laurie
 Buster Keaton as Harrison
 Chico Marx as Mr. Kramer
 Sylvia Sidney as Mrs. Kramer
 Shepperd Strudwick as Reagan
 Regis Toomey as Joe Donaldson
 Frank Wilcox
 Ron Hargrave
 Sam Gillman
 Charles Bronson

Production
Jaime del Valle was the producer, and David Swift directed. David Swift and Charles Einstein wrote the teleplay as an adaptation of Einstein's 1957 novel, No Time at All. The production was presented on videotape.

The film's star, William Lundigan, was previously the host of the CBS television series, Climax!. No Time at All was Lundigan's first dramatic role in four years.

Reception
In The New York Times, Jack Gould referred to the large cast as "half of Hollywood in search of a play." He panned the story as "utterly pedestrian nonsense, wildly implausible in detail and patched together with bits and pieces of second-hand emotionalism."

Television critic Bill Fiset wrote that the story "was remarkably without any continuity, motivation, emotion or even common sense" and "fell with an awful thud."  As for the overall production, Fiset opined that it "had all the merits of a Class D British movie."

References

1958 American television episodes
Playhouse 90 (season 2) episodes
1958 television plays